1771 Naval Air Squadron (1771 NAS) was a Naval Air Squadron of the Royal Navy's Fleet Air Arm. The squadron was the first British & Commonwealth unit to fly over Japan in World War 2.

Aircraft flown
1771 Naval Air Squadron flew only one aircraft type:

Fairey Firefly

References

Citations

Bibliography

1700 series Fleet Air Arm squadrons
Military units and formations established in 1944
Military units and formations of the Royal Navy in World War II